kupikupifm is a radio station from Sabah, Malaysia. The station features topics ranging from customs and traditions to social-economic development, global and social trends, health and nutrition as well as agriculture and enables local entertainers to showcase their talents with the station playing 80% Sabahan songs. It can also be heard from Kuala Penyu to Kota Belud and plans to expand transmission to other parts of Sabah in future.

References

External links 
 

2016 establishments in Malaysia
Radio stations established in 2016
Radio stations in Malaysia